The Nadel Essay Prize is an award in the field of anthropology presented by the Asia Pacific Journal of Anthropology for excellence in ethnographic writing relating to the Asia Pacific region, including Australia. Inaugurated in 2011 to commemorate 60 years of Anthropology at the Australian National University, the Prize commemorates the life and work of Siegfried Frederick Nadel, Foundation Professor of Anthropology. Eligible papers are those submitted or accepted for publication by an early career researcher.

Winners
2011: Catherine Ingram, Tradition and Divergence in Southwestern China: Kam Big Song Singing in the Village and on Stage
2012: 
2013: Judith Bovensiepen, Paying for the Dead: On the Politics of Death in Independent Timor-Leste
2014: Kyung-Nan Koh, Translating ‘Sustainability’ in Hawai'i: The Utility of Semiotic Transformation in the Transmission of Culture
2015: 
2016: Ho Cheuk-Yu, Affective Housing Ownership in China's New Property Regime
2017: Sacha Cody, Borrowing from the Rural to Help the Urban

See also

 List of anthropology awards

External links
 The Asia Pacific Journal of Anthropology 
Awards established in 2011
Anthropology awards
Social sciences awards